Adam Bruno Ulam (8 April 1922 – 28 March 2000) was a Polish-American historian of Jewish descent and political scientist at Harvard University. Ulam was one of the world's foremost authorities and top experts in Sovietology and Kremlinology, he authored multiple books and articles in these academic disciplines.

Biography
Adam B. Ulam was born on April 8, 1922, in Lwów then a major city in Poland, now Lviv in Ukraine, to the parents of a wealthy well-assimilated Jewish family. After graduating from high school, on or around August 20, 1939, his 13-years-older brother Stanisław Ulam, a famous mathematician and key contributor to the Manhattan Project, took him to the United States to continue his education. Their father had, at the last minute, changed their departure date from September 3 to August 20, most likely saving Adam's life since on September 1 the Second World War began, with Nazi Germany's invasion of Poland. Apart from the brothers Ulam, all other family members who remained in Poland were murdered in the Holocaust.

Adam had United States citizenship by 1939, and tried to enlist in the US army twice after the United States entered the war, but was rejected at first for having "relatives living in enemy territory" and later for myopia. He studied at Brown University and taught briefly at University of Wisconsin–Madison. After studies at Harvard University (1944–1947), he got a doctoral degree under William Yandell Elliott for his thesis Idealism and the Development of English Socialism, which was awarded the 1947 Delancey K. Jay Prize. He became a faculty member at Harvard in 1947, he received tenure in 1954, and until his retirement in 1992 was Gurney Professor of History and Political Science. He directed the Russian Research Center (1973–1974) and was a research associate for the Center for International Studies at the Massachusetts Institute of Technology (1953–1955). He was a member of both the American Academy of Arts and Sciences and the American Philosophical Society.

He married in 1963, divorced in 1991, and had two sons. On March 28, 2000, he died from lung cancer in Cambridge, Massachusetts, at the age of 77 and was buried at the Mount Auburn Cemetery.

Works
Ulam authored multiple books and articles, and his writings were primarily dedicated to Sovietology, Kremlinology and the Cold War. His best-known book is Expansion and Coexistence: The History of Soviet Foreign Policy, 1917-67 (1968).

In his first book, Titoism and the Cominform (1952), based on his doctoral thesis, he argued that Communists' focus on certain goals blinded them to disastrous socioeconomic side effects that had the capacity to weaken their hold on power. His book The Unfinished Revolution: An Essay on the Sources of Influence of Marxism and Communism (1960) explored Marxist thought. His two books The Bolsheviks: The Intellectual and Political History of the Triumph of Communism in Russia (1965) and Stalin: The Man and His Era (1973) are internationally recognized as the standard biographies of Vladimir Lenin and Joseph Stalin, respectively. He also wrote two sequels, The Rivals: America and Russia since World War II (1971) and Dangerous Relations: The Soviet Union in World Politics, 1970-1982 (1983).

He also wrote a novel, The Kirov Affair (1988), about the Soviet 1930s. In one of his last books, The Communists: The Story of Power and Lost Illusions 1948-1991, published in 1992, the year he retired, he commented on the fall of the Soviet Union, writing that Communists fell from power because their ideology was misguided and  the governing elites' growing awareness of their error led to their demoralization, which in turn fed growing tensions and conflicts within and between Communist states.

The major exceptions in his book publications were Philosophical Foundations of English Socialism and The Fall of the American University, a critique of U.S. higher education, written in 1972.

Books
Many of the books are online and free to borrow for two weeks
Titoism and the Cominform (1952)
Patterns of Government: The Major Political Systems of Europe, with Samuel H. Beer, Harry H. Eckstein, Herbert J. Spiro, and Nicholas Wahl, edited with S.H. Beer (1958)
The Unfinished Revolution: An Essay on the Sources of Influence of Marxism and Communism (1960), online 
The New Face of Soviet Totalitarianism (1963)
Philosophical Foundations of English Socialism (1964)
The Bolsheviks: The Intellectual and Political History of the Triumph of Communism in Russia (1965)
Expansion and Coexistence, The History of Soviet Foreign Policy, 1917-67 (1968), online 
The Rivals. America and Russia since World War II (1971), online 
The Fall of the American University (1972)
Stalin: The Man and His Era (1973), online 
The Russian Political System (1974), online 
Ideologies and Illusions: Revolutionary Thought from Herzen to Solzhenitsyn (1976), online 
In the Name of the People: Prophets and Conspirators in Prerevolutionary Russia (1977), online 
Russia's Failed Revolutions: From the Decembrists to the Dissidents (1981)
Dangerous Relations: Soviet Union in World Politics, 1970-82 (1983)
The Kirov Affair (1988) - note: a novel, online 
The Communists: The Story of Power and Lost Illusions, 1948-1991 (1992)
A History of Soviet Russia (1997)
 Understanding the Cold War: A Historian's Personal Reflections - note: a memoir (2000)

References

 The Soviet Empire Reconsidered; Essays in Honor of Adam B. Ulam, edited by Sanford R. Lieberman, David E. Powell, Carol R. Saivetz, and Sarah M. Terry, Routledge, 1994
 Kramer, Mark, "Memorial Notice: Adam Bruno Ulam (1922–2000)", Journal of Cold War Studies, vol. 2, no. 2, spring 2000, pp. 130–132

External links
 Harvard News and Events: Memorial Minute: Adam Bruno Ulam read by Timothy J. Colton in 2002 and printed in the Harvard University Gazette
 Adam Ulam's memorial page, with obituaries, biography, letters and other items
 The Harvard Gazette obituary
 The Washington Post obituary
 The New York Times obituary

1922 births
2000 deaths
Jews from Galicia (Eastern Europe)
American agnostics
Jewish agnostics
Jewish American historians
Historians of Russia
Harvard University faculty
Brown University alumni
Harvard University alumni
Jewish emigrants from Nazi Germany to the United States
People from Lwów Voivodeship
Deaths from lung cancer
University of Wisconsin–Madison faculty
20th-century American historians
20th-century American male writers
American male non-fiction writers
American anti-communists
Members of the American Philosophical Society